Kim Ji-min (born February 12, 2000) is a South Korean actress. She is best known for her roles in Goddess of Fire (2013) and Pluto Secret Society (2014). Since January, 2020 she is part of SM Culture & Contents (under SM Entertainment.).

Filmography

Film

Television series

Awards and nominations

References

External links

Kim Ji-Min at SM Culture & Contents

2000 births
Living people
21st-century South Korean actresses
JYP Entertainment artists
South Korean child actresses
South Korean film actresses
South Korean television actresses
South Korean television presenters
South Korean women television presenters